James Brusseau is a philosopher specializing in contemporary Continental philosophy, history of philosophy and ethics. In 1994 Brusseau joined the faculty of Philosophy and Letters at the Mexican National University in Mexico City teaching graduate courses in philosophy and comparative literature. He has also taught in Europe and the California State University. Currently he teaches at Pace University in New York City. Brusseau took a Ph.D. in Philosophy under the direction of Alphonso Lingis He is currently a professor at Pace University in New York City. He is married to a Spaniard and has two children.

Scholarship 
Brusseau's scholarship focuses on philosophical decadence, which he defines as philosophers stepping aside from the task of making accurate theories about the larger world, and instead endeavoring to produce theories that in their turn provoke more theorizing. Within this framework, whether a philosopher is actually right about things becomes a secondary or derivative concern. The guiding purpose is to provoke more strictly philosophical discussion and study. As a result, the best philosophical idea directly equals the one producing the most subsequent philosophizing.

Brusseau attempts to locate decadence in the history of philosophy at Friedrich Nietzsche’s appropriation by recent French philosophers including Michel Foucault, Gilles Deleuze and Jacques Derrida.  He calls the moment a “reversal” in philosophy’s history, one where thought no longer exists to pursue truth, instead, truths exist to serve and accelerate thinking.

It is unclear from Brusseau’s published work and lectures whether he considers this development to be negative, neutral or positive.

Philosophical and applied ethics 

Brusseau’s academic research in philosophical ethics explores the human experience of artificial intelligence in the areas of privacy, freedom, authenticity, and personal identity  In the area of applied ethics, one study employs natural language processing to generate ethical evaluations of companies that function with artificial intelligence at the core of their operation, effectively using AI to apply AI ethics to AI.

In Business Ethics Workshop, Brusseau focuses on philosophical approaches to the corporation’s role in society, and ethical questions arising around branding and the creation of product reputation. The fabrication of consumer needs and consumer identity is also considered.

Brusseau's Dignity, Pleasures, Vulgarity: Philosophy and Animal Rights asks how animal studies reflect back to reveal human truths.

The documentary Wealth Inequality Workshop unites utilitarianism, Rawls, Nozick, Bataille and Deleuze to explore theoretical dilemmas of wealth inequality. Brusseau argues that the philosophies of Bataille and Deleuze can be mobilized both to allow and limit wealth inequality.

Books 
 Isolated Experiences, State University of New York Press, 1996
 Decadence of the French Nietzsche, Rowman & Littlefield, 2004
 Empire of Humiliation, Overflow, 2008
 Business Ethics Workshop, Flat World Knowledge, 2011
 Ethics Workshop, Flat World Knowledge, 2015
 Dignity, Pleasures, Vulgarity: Philosophy + Animal Rights, Overflow, 2016

External links
 Personal webpage
 James Brusseau webpage at Pace University

References

1964 births
Living people
20th-century Mexican philosophers
21st-century Mexican philosophers
Animal rights scholars
Continental philosophers
Postmodern theory
Post-structuralism
Historians of philosophy